The Fujifilm FinePix S100fs is a digital camera manufactured by Fujifilm. It is part of their FinePix S-series range.

Technical specifications

References 
http://www.fujifilm.com/support/digital_cameras/specifications/s/finepix_s100fs/
http://www.dpreview.com/reviews/fujifilms100fs

S100fs